Didrik Bastian Juell (born 22 February 1990) is a Norwegian freestyle skier. He was born in Oslo. He competed at the 2014 Winter Olympics in Sochi, in ski-cross.

References

External links

1990 births
Living people
Skiers from Oslo
Freestyle skiers at the 2014 Winter Olympics
Norwegian male freestyle skiers
Olympic freestyle skiers of Norway